Kossuth Lajos tér (Lajos Kossuth Square) is a station on the M2 (East-West) line of the Budapest Metro. It is located south of Lajos Kossuth Square in Pest, immediately on the left bank of the Danube river. The station was open on 22 December 1972 as part of the extension of the line from Deák Ferenc tér to Déli pályaudvar.

Connections
 Tram
2 Jászai Mari tér – Közvágóhíd
2B Jászai Mari tér – Pesterzsébet, Pacsirtatelep
2M Jászai Mari tér – Keleti pályaudvar
 Trolleybus
70 Erzsébet királyné útja, aluljáró – Kossuth Lajos tér
78 Keleti pályaudvar (Garay utca) – Kossuth Lajos tér
 Bus: 15, 115

Gallery

References

External links

M2 (Budapest Metro) stations
Railway stations opened in 1973